Tyrophagus casei, the cheese mite, is a species of mite which is inoculated into  and Altenburger Ziegenkäse cheese during their production.

The surface of cheese which has been colonised by mites may be covered with a fine, grey powder or bloom, due to the mites themselves and their moulted skin and faeces. These impart a distinctive "piquant" taste to various cheeses.

See also
Cheese mite
Cheese fly or cheese skipper, Piophila casei

References

External links
 Includes The Cheese Mites (1903), the first science documentary meant for the public.
A Parable by Sir Arthur Conan Doyle, at Wikisource
The Dying Whip by Sir Arthur Conan Doyle, at Wikisource
From a College Window by Arthur Christopher Benson, at Project Gutenberg

Acaridae
Animals described in 1910
Taxa named by Anthonie Cornelis Oudemans